Edson Williams (born October 30, 1966) is a visual effects supervisor. Williams and his fellow visual effects artists are nominated for an Academy Award for Best Visual Effects for the 2013 film The Lone Ranger.

Selected filmography 
 The Lone Ranger (2013; co-nominated with Tim Alexander, Gary Brozenich and John Frazier)

References

External links

Visual effects supervisors
Living people
1966 births
Artists from Anchorage, Alaska
Best Visual Effects BAFTA Award winners